Eoneria is a genus of flies in the family Neriidae.

Species
Eoneria blanchardi 1951, 1961
Eoneria maldonadoi Aczél, 1961

References

Brachycera genera
Neriidae
Diptera of South America
Endemic fauna of Argentina